The 1984 Big League World Series took place from August 11–18 in Fort Lauderdale, Florida, United States. Taipei, Taiwan defeated Maracaibo, Venezuela in the championship game. It was Taiwan's second straight championship

Teams

Results

References

Big League World Series
Big League World Series